Baden Langton was one of several early co-anchors of CTV National News, and worked with anchor Peter Jennings.

Langton began in radio with CKPC in Brantford, Ontario before moving to stations in Hamilton and Ottawa where he moved into television and became co-anchor of the CTV National News with Jennings from 1962 until 1964, when he moved to ABC News in the United States where he was soon joined by Jennings. Langton joined ABC Radio, first in New York and then in Washington as White House correspondent on radio and television and as a radio anchor. Langton and his family moved back to Canada in 1967 as their son, Max, was approaching draft age and the Vietnam War was heating up. His wife, Norah Halajian Langton died in 2009.

References

External links
 Baden Langton biography (Brantford Collegiate Institute) (Wayback Machine)
 

Canadian television news anchors
Year of birth missing (living people)
Living people
ABC News personalities
American radio news anchors
CTV Television Network people